The 2010–11 Primera División season is the 92nd of Costa Rica's top-flight professional football league. The season is divided into two championships: the Invierno and the Verano.

Promotion and relegation 

Teams promoted from 2009–10 Segunda División
 Barrio México
 Limón F.C.

Teams relegated to 2010–11 Segunda División
 Águilas Guanacastecas
 Ramonense

Team information

Campeonato de Invierno
The 2010 Campeonato de Invierno, officially the 2010 Campeonato de Invierno Scotiabank for sponsorship reasons, is the first tournament of the season. The tournament began on July 24, 2010 and is scheduled to end in December.

First stage

Standings

Results

Second stage

1advances on regular season away goal differential

Campeonato de Verano
The 2010 Campeonato de Verano began on January 8, 2011 and is scheduled to end in May. During the competition, Barrio México were expelled from the competition due to various financial difficulties. After this decision, all of Barrio México's matches were awarded 3–0 against them.

First stage

Standings

Results

Second stage

Aggregate table

References

External links
UNAFUT's official website 

Liga FPD seasons
1
Costa